Grabina  is a settlement in the administrative district of Gmina Zagórów, within Słupca County, Greater Poland Voivodeship, in west-central Poland.

The settlement has a population of eight.

Grabina is one of the sites of Nazi crimes against the Polish nation. During the German occupation of Poland (World War II), on 21–22 November 1939, 10 Polish inhabitants of the nearby town of Zagórów, former participants of the Polish Greater Poland uprising (1918–19), were murdered by the Germans in the forest near the village. There is a monument at the site of the massacre.

The village was a place of bog iron mining.

References

Villages in Słupca County